Albright may refer to:

Albright (surname)
Albright, Alberta, Canada
Albright, West Virginia, United States
Albright College, a liberal arts college located in Reading, Pennsylvania, United States
Albright–Knox Art Gallery, Buffalo, New York, United States
Albright Memorial Building, Scranton, Pennsylvania, United States
Albright special, a knot

See also
Allbright, Missouri, United States